D&S may refer to:
 Domination and submission (BDSM), or
 the Chilean company Distribución y Servicio (D&S)

See also
 S&D (disambiguation)